The women's 1500 metres event  at the 2000 European Athletics Indoor Championships was held on February 25–26.

Medalists

Results

Heats
First 3 of each heat (Q) and the next 3 fastest (q) qualified for the final.

Final

References
Results

1500 metres at the European Athletics Indoor Championships
1500
2000 in women's athletics